Pycnarmon leucodoce is a moth in the family Crambidae. It was described by Edward Meyrick in 1936. It is found in the former provinces of Équateur and Katanga in the Democratic Republic of the Congo.

The larvae feed on Stipularia africana.

References

Spilomelinae
Moths described in 1936
Moths of Africa